Jackson is an unincorporated community in Beaverhead County, Montana, United States. Jackson has a post office with a ZIP code 59736. As of the 2020 census, Jackson had a population of 36.

History
The post office opened on August 1, 1896. The town is named after the first postmaster, Anton H. Jackson.

Geography
Jackson lies on Montana Secondary Highway 278, south of Wisdom and northwest of Dillon. Hot springs are just east of the town. Warm Springs Creek flows nearby. Tweedy Mountain is to the east and Bannack State Park is to the south.

Demographics

Education
Jackson provides elementary education. High school is at Beaverhead County High School.

References

Unincorporated communities in Beaverhead County, Montana
Unincorporated communities in Montana